Bruno Carmeni (born December 29, 1940 in Beirut, Lebanon) is an Italian judoka, who started training judo in 1955. He competed at the 1964 Summer Olympics.

Early life 
At the age of fifteen (1955) some friends asked him to come to judo with them. This is how he started at the club of Fiamma Yamato located in via Corvieri in Rome (Italy). He had several masters among which Vittorio Porceddu, Elio Paci, Vinicio Volpi and last but not least Noritomo Ken Otani. Thanks to the latter he was introduced to  a judo form much closer to the original Japanese one, allowing him to perfection his judo techniques. Thanks to the skill of this master he learns to understand the term Do, the way, that allows him to reach several goals. Already in 1960 he has his first results by winning the silver medal at the Italian Championships for blue and brown belts, allowing him to open the doors in order to get into the Italian National Squad. In the same year he gets his black belt 1st dan. He continues to win at many National and Regional Tournaments and is noticed by the Federal Sports Director, who calls him to participate at several trainings of the National Team. In 1961 he enters as voluntary the Police at the Sports Center of the Fiamme Oro (Gold Flame, State Police) and is sent to the Sports Center of Nettuno. Here he perfections further more his judo techniques, thanks to the contribution of master Otani and this allows him to win the first Italian Title in the up to 68 kg weight division in Perugia. In the afternoon of the same day he wins also the Silver medal in the open weight division. Another six National Titles follow after this first time in Perugia.

Competitor
He is 21 times member of the Italian National Team and participates at 8 European Championships. In 1963 he wins the Silver Medal at the European Championships in Geneva (Switzerland), becoming the first Italian light weight in Italian’s judo history to reach this goal. The Italian National Olympic Committee adds him to the list of “Probable Olympians” for the 1964 Tokyo Olympics. He participates at this first time judo event at the Olympic Games along with Nicola Tempesta (the only two Italians who participated in judo). After the competition at the Olympics he becomes a member of the team "Rest of the World”, touring Japan to fight against Japanese teams in Tokyo, Tenri, Nagoya, Yokohama, and Fukuoka, where he places first. Thanks to the help of master Ken Otani he gets a scholarship to enter the University of Tenri (Nara). He remains in Japan for two years studying judo and the Japanese language, getting a diploma in the latter. During his stay there he has had the chance to study under several outstanding masters among which Ken Otani (9th  dan), Kotani (10th  dan), Ebii (9th  dan), Matsumoto (9th  dan), Daigo (9th  dan), Osawa (8th  dan) and Hashimoto (8th  dan).
He returns to Italy in 1966, where he wins other National Titles and several silver and bronze medals; in total he participates at 44 National Championships.

Trainer
In 1970 he quits with competitions and becomes first the trainer of the Junior National Team and then of the Senior Team, followed by the University Team and the National Visually Impaired one, belonging to the National Blind Sports Federation (FICS), later called Italian Federation of Disabled Sport (FISD). Later he becomes the National Sports Director of the later.
In 1971 the Italian National Judo Academy is founded, of which he is the first teacher. He is elected to the Council of the Technical Teachers Order of the Federation and after that is part of several National Technical Commissions in order to define the technical programs for grading and qualification and also for teaching.

International career
In 1987 he is nominated Chairman for Judo within the International Blind Sport Association (IBSA), position, that he keeps for five Olympic four years periods. He becomes also member of the International Paralympic Committee. He tours the world for conferences, technical and pedagogical updating courses. He has contacts and meetings with the International Judo Federation and the Continental Judo Unions, in which he promotes the cause of the Visually Impaired Athletes under the slogan “disability maximum ability”.
He is Technical Delegate at the following Paralympic Games: Seoul (1988), Barcelona (1992), Atlanta (1996), Sydney (2000), Athens (2004) and VIP Guest at Beijing (2008)and London (2012). He is Director at 11 World Championships, 13 Europeans and 2 Asian Games. He receives many National and International awards among which: Knight to the Merit of the Italian Republic, Gold Star of the National Italian Olympic Committee, Gold Star of the Olympic Committee of the Russian Confederation as first foreigner honored by such award, Ambassador of  USA Judo, awards from the Olympic Committees of Algeria, China and Libya. He receives the International Cultural and Sport Lions Club prize, the Bronze Medal from the International Judo Federation and the Honors Medal from the Italian National Judo Federation (FIJLKAM). He is Well-deserving and International Referee, Well-deserving Master. He receives a special motion from the University of Fighting Arts, the Yong In University Korea. In 2018 the FIJLKAM Chairman awards him with the 9th dan, one among the highest recognitions both National and International.
He writes many technical books, which deal with judo teaching methods for kids, grading systems, judo’s pedagogy and psychology, judo’s culture, the kata, sensorial disabled athletes and their integration thanks to the practice of judo. His books have been translated into English, Spanish, Arabic, Braille and mentioned all around the world.
In 2007 he is nominated technical consultant of the Visually Impaired Chinese National Judo Team for the Beijing 2008 Paralympics.
Thanks to the outstanding teaching method in favor of the members of the American Police, he is nominated Honor Member of the New Jersey Police (USA)
At the Judo World Championships, which took place in São Paulo (Brazil) in June 2007 he won two Silver medals (weight division and open).
In 2018 he is awarded by the Association of the National Police Treviso Section and by the CONCILIO DE MAESTROS DE LAS ARTES MARCIALES in Cartagena Spain.

He teaches and is Sport Director of the ASD Judo Club Conegliano, Treviso (Italy).

Throughout the years he has maintained his strong bond to Japan and since 2006 he has been regularly once or twice a year there. In 2010 the idea to open a Japanese Cultural Center at the Judo Club Conegliano, thus promoting activities such as Japanese Language, Ikebana, Taiko and more. 
In 2012 he reaches an agreement with the Judo Headquarter in Tenri becoming Tenri Judo Conegliano.

References

External links
http://tenrijudoconegliano.com

1940 births
Sportspeople from Beirut
Italian male judoka
Living people
Judoka trainers
Olympic judoka of Italy
Judoka at the 1964 Summer Olympics
Lebanese emigrants to Italy
Sportspeople of Lebanese descent